Made in America is an orchestral composition in one movement by the American composer Joan Tower.  The work was jointly commissioned by the League of American Orchestras and Meet the Composer.  It was first performed in Glens Falls, New York by the Glens Falls Symphony Orchestra in October 2005.

Composition
Made in America is composed in a single movement and has a duration of roughly 13 minutes.  The main theme of the work is based on the song "America the Beautiful."  Tower described the inspiration for the piece in the score program notes, writing:

Instrumentation
The work is scored for an orchestra comprising two flutes (doubling piccolo), two oboes, two clarinets, two bassoons, two horns, two trumpets, trombone, timpani, percussion, and strings.

Reception
Made in America has received praise from music critics.  Allan Kozinn of The New York Times praised the work, remarking:
A recording of the work, performed by Leonard Slatkin and the Nashville Symphony, won the 2008 Grammy Award for Best Classical Contemporary Composition, in addition to the Grammy Awards for Best Classical Album and Best Orchestral Performance.

References

Compositions by Joan Tower
2004 compositions
Compositions for symphony orchestra